Oh Yoon-kyung (born 6 August 1941) is a North Korean football defender who played for North Korea in the 1966 FIFA World Cup. He also played for August 8 Club.

References

1941 births
North Korean footballers
North Korea international footballers
Association football defenders
1966 FIFA World Cup players
Living people